Amazon.com, Inc. is an American multinational technology company which focuses on e-commerce, cloud computing, and digital streaming. It has been referred to as "one of the most influential economic and cultural forces in the world", and is one of the world's most valuable brands.

Amazon was founded by Jeff Bezos from his garage in Bellevue, Washington, on July 5, 1994. Initially an online marketplace for books, it has expanded into a multitude of product categories: a strategy that has earned it the moniker The Everything Store. It has multiple subsidiaries including Amazon Web Services (cloud computing), Zoox (autonomous vehicles), Kuiper Systems (satellite Internet), Amazon Lab126 (computer hardware R&D). Its other subsidiaries include Ring, Twitch, IMDb, MGM Holdings and Whole Foods Market.

Founding 
The company was created as a result of what Jeff Bezos called his "regret minimization framework" – to avoid regretting, in his old age, not having tried to participate in the emerging internet with his own startup. In 1994, Bezos left his job as a vice president at D. E. Shaw & Co., a Wall Street firm, and moved to Seattle, Washington, where he began to work on a business plan for what would become Amazon.com.

On July 5, 1994, Bezos initially incorporated the company in Washington state with the name Cadabra, Inc. After a few months, he changed the name to Amazon.com, Inc, because a lawyer misheard its original name as "cadaver". Bezos selected this name by looking through a dictionary; he settled on "Amazon" because it was a place that was "exotic and different", just as he had envisioned for his Internet enterprise. The Amazon River, he noted, was the biggest river in the world, and he planned to make his store the biggest bookstore in the world. Additionally, a name that began with "A" was preferred because it would probably be at the top of an alphabetized list. Bezos placed a premium on his head start in building a brand and told a reporter, "There's nothing about our model that can't be copied over time. But you know, McDonald's got copied. And it's still built a huge, multibillion-dollar company. A lot of it comes down to the brand name. Brand names are more important online than they are in the physical world."

In its early days, the company was operated out of the garage of Bezos's house on Northeast 28th Street in Bellevue, Washington.

Online bookstore and IPO 
After reading a report about the future of the Internet that projected annual web commerce growth at 2,300%, Bezos created a list of 20 products that could be marketed online. He narrowed the list to what he felt were the five most promising products, which included: compact discs, computer hardware, computer software, videos, and books. Bezos finally decided that his new business would sell books online, because of the large worldwide demand for literature, the low unit price for books, and the huge number of titles available in print. Amazon was founded in the garage of Bezos' rented home in Bellevue, Washington. Bezos' parents invested almost $250,000 in the start-up.

On July 16, 1995, Amazon opened as an online bookseller, selling the world's largest collection of books to anyone with World Wide Web access. The first book sold on Amazon.com was Douglas Hofstadter's Fluid Concepts and Creative Analogies: Computer Models of the Fundamental Mechanisms of Thought. In the first two months of business, Amazon sold to all 50 states and over 45 countries. Within two months, Amazon's sales were up to $20,000 per week. In October 1995, the company announced itself to the public. In 1996, it was reincorporated in Delaware. Amazon issued its initial public offering of capital stock on May 15, 1997, at $18 per share, trading under the NASDAQ stock exchange symbol AMZN.

Barnes & Noble sued Amazon on May 12, 1997, alleging that Amazon's claim to be "the world's largest bookstore" was false because it "...wasn't a bookstore at all. It's a book broker." The suit was later settled out of court and Amazon continued to make the same claim. Walmart sued Amazon on October 16, 1998, alleging that Amazon had stolen Walmart's trade secrets by hiring former Walmart executives. Although this suit was also settled out of court, it caused Amazon to implement internal restrictions and the reassignment of the former Walmart executives.

In 1999, Amazon first attempted to enter the publishing business by buying a defunct imprint, "Weathervane", and publishing some books "selected with no apparent thought", according to The New Yorker. The imprint quickly vanished again, and  Amazon representatives said that they had never heard of it. Also in 1999, Time magazine named Bezos the Person of the Year when it recognized the company's success in popularizing online shopping.

2000s 
Since June 19, 2000, Amazon's logotype has featured a curved arrow leading from A to Z, representing that the company carries every product from A to Z, with the arrow shaped like a smile.

According to sources, Amazon did not expect to make a profit for four to five years. This comparatively slow growth caused stockholders to complain that the company was not reaching profitability fast enough to justify their investment or even survive in the long term. In 2001, the dot-com bubble burst destroyed many e-companies in the process, but Amazon survived and moved forward beyond the tech crash to become a huge player in online sales. The company finally turned its first profit in the fourth quarter of 2001: $0.01 (i.e., 1¢ per share), on revenues of more than $1 billion. This profit margin, though extremely modest, proved to skeptics that Bezos' unconventional business model could succeed.

2010s to present 
In 2011, Amazon had 30,000 full-time employees in the US, and by the end of 2016, it had 180,000 employees.

In 2014, Amazon launched the Fire Phone.  The Fire Phone was meant to deliver media streaming options but the venture failed, resulting in Amazon registering a $170 million loss.  This would also lead to the Fire Phone production being stopped the following year. In August of the same year, Amazon would finalize the acquisition of Twitch, a social video gaming streaming site, for $970 million.  This new acquisition would be integrated into the game production division of Amazon.

In June 2017, Amazon announced that it would acquire Whole Foods, a high-end supermarket chain with over 400 stores, for $13.4 billion. The acquisition was seen by media experts as a move to strengthen its physical holdings and challenge Walmart's supremacy as a brick and mortar retailer. This sentiment was heightened by the fact that the announcement coincided with Walmart's purchase of men's apparel company Bonobos.  On August 23, 2017, Whole Foods shareholders, as well as the Federal Trade Commission, approved the deal.

In September 2017, Amazon announced plans to locate a second headquarters in a metropolitan area with at least a million people. Cities needed to submit their presentations by October 19, 2017, for the project called HQ2. The $5 billion second headquarters, starting with 500,000 square feet and eventually expanding to as much as 8 million square feet, may have as many as 50,000 employees. In 2017, Amazon announced it would build a new downtown Seattle building with space for Mary's Place, a local charity in 2020.

As 2017 came to a close, Amazon had over 566,000 employees worldwide.

According to an August 8, 2018, story in Bloomberg Businessweek, Amazon has about a 5 percent share of US retail spending (excluding cars and car parts and visits to restaurants and bars), and a 43.5 percent share of American online spending in 2018. The forecast is for Amazon to own 49 percent of the total American online spending in 2018, with two-thirds of Amazon's revenue coming from the US.

Amazon launched the last-mile delivery program and ordered 20,000 Mercedes-Benz Sprinter Vans for the service in September 2018.

Amazon generated $386 billion in US retail e-commerce sales in 2020, up 38% over 2019. Amazon's Marketplace sales represent an increasingly dominant portion of its e-commerce business.

On November 14, 2022, it was announced that Amazon had plans to lay off 10,000 employees among its corporate and technology staff.

HQ2
In November 2018, Amazon announced it would open its highly sought-after new headquarters, known as (HQ2) in Long Island City, Queens, New York City, and in the Crystal City neighborhood of Arlington, Virginia. On February 14, 2019, Amazon announced it was not moving forward with plans to build HQ2 in Queens but would instead focus solely on the Arlington location. The company plans to locate at least 25,000 employees at HQ2 by 2030 and will invest more than US$2.5 billion to establish its new headquarters in Crystal City as well as neighboring Pentagon City and Potomac Yard, an area jointly marketed as "National Landing." The announcement also created a new partnership with Virginia Tech University to develop an Innovation Campus to fill demand for high-tech talent in National Landing and beyond.

COVID-19
At the end of March 2020, some workers of the Staten Island warehouse staged a walkout in protest of the poor health situation at their workplace amidst the 2020 COVID-19 pandemic. One of the organizers, Chris Smalls, was first put on quarantine without anyone else being quarantined, and soon afterwards fired from the company.

The pandemic caused a surge in online shopping and resulted in shortages of household staples both online and some brick-and-mortar stores. From March 17 to April 10, 2020, Amazon warehouses stopped accepting non-essential items from third-party sellers. The company hired approximately 175,000 additional warehouse workers and delivery contractors to deal with the surge, and temporarily raised wages by $2/hour.

Acquisition of MGM
After months of speculation due to MGM's poor financial performance from the COVID-19 pandemic's impact on the movie industry, Amazon entered negotiations to acquire MGM at an estimated  on May 17, 2021. The deal would allow Amazon to add the MGM library to the Amazon Prime Video catalog, with the studio continuing to operate as a label under the new parent company. The merger was finalized on March 17, 2022, following the expiration of the FTC's review deadline and having cleared the European Commission two days earlier on March 15. Later that day, Amazon Studios and Prime Video SVP Mike Hopkins revealed that Amazon will continue to partner with United Artists Releasing (MGM and Annapurna Pictures' joint distribution venture), which will remain in operation to release all future MGM titles theatrically on a "case-by-case basis," while "all MGM employees will join my organization." It was also revealed that Amazon had no plans to make changes to the studio's production slate and release schedules nor make all MGM content exclusive to Prime Video, providing some hope that the studio would operate autonomously from Amazon Studios. These plans are expected to not impact the future of the James Bond franchise and its creative team. Two town halls further detailing MGM's future post-merger took place on March 18, 2022, which included one for MGM employees and one for Amazon Studios/Prime Video employees. Both revealed the new interim reporting structure as part of Amazon's "phased integration plan," which would involve De Luca, Mark Burnett (Chairman of MGM Worldwide Television) and COO Chris Brearton reporting to Hopkins on behalf of the studio. On April 27, 2022, it was announced that De Luca and Abdy would leave the studio.

Amazon Go 
On January 22, 2018, Amazon Go, a store that uses cameras and sensors to detect items that a shopper grabs off shelves and automatically charges a shopper's Amazon account, was opened to the general public in Seattle. Customers scan their Amazon Go app as they enter, and are required to have an Amazon Go app installed on their smartphone and a linked Amazon account to be able to enter. The technology is meant to eliminate the need for checkout lines. Amazon Go was initially opened for Amazon employees in December 2016. By the end of 2018, there will be 8 total Amazon Go stores located in Seattle, Chicago, San Francisco and New York.

Amazon 4-Star 
Amazon announced to debut the Amazon 4-star in New York, Soho neighborhood Spring Street between Crosby and Lafayette on 27 September 2018. The store carries 4-star and above-rated products from around New York. The Amazon website searches for the most rated, highly demanded, frequently bought, and most wished for products which are then sold in the new Amazon store under separate categories. Along with the paper price tags, the online review cards will also be available for the customers to read before buying the product. In late 2021, Amazon opened two 4-star stores in the United Kingdom. Its store at the Bluewater Shopping Centre in Kent opened in October, and its store at Westfield London opened in November.

In March 2022, Amazon announced that they would be closing all 4-star stores, along with their Books and Pop Up stores, across the US and the UK, stating that they were refocusing on their grocery and fashion stores.

Mergers and acquisitions 
Amazon has grown through several mergers and acquisitions. The company has also invested in a number of growing firms, both in the United States and internationally. In 2014, Amazon purchased top level domain .buy in auction for over $4 million. The company has invested in brands that offer a wide range of services and products, including Engine Yard, a Ruby-on-Rails platform as a service company, and Living Social, a local deal site.

Timeline

Overview

Full timeline

References 

Amazon (company)
Amazon